Jayasinghe is a Sinhalese surname that consists of two parts: jaya, which means victory in Sinhalese and is also the name of a Hindu demigod, and singhe (lion). The name may refer to the following notable people:

Susanthika Jayasinghe (born 1975), Sri Lankan athlete
Chinthaka Jayasinghe (born 1978), Sri Lankan cricketer
Dilan Jayasingha (born 1987), Sri Lankan American hip-hop artist
Stanley Jayasinghe (born 1931), former Sri Lankan cricketer
Lalith Jayasinghe (1974 - 2008), lieutenant colonel in the Sri Lanka Army
Rohan Jayasinghe (born 1956), brigadier in the Sri Lanka Army
Sunil Jayasinghe (born 1955), former Sri Lankan cricketer
Chandrani Bandara Jayasinghe (born 1962), member of the Parliament of Sri Lanka
G. R. Jayasinghe, Brigadier in the Sri Lanka Army
Izzy Jayasinghe, biophysicist 
N. D. N. P. Jayasinghe, former member of the Parliament of Sri Lanka

B Jayasinghe Corporate Trainer, Media Personality

References

Sinhalese surnames
Surnames of Sri Lankan origin